The Haridasa Bhakti Sahitya devotional movement (sampradaya) originated in Karnataka, India, after Madhvacharya, and spread to eastern states such as Bengal and Assam of medieval India. Over a span of nearly six centuries, several saints and mystics helped shape the culture, philosophy and art of South India in general and Karnataka in particular by exerting considerable spiritual influence over the masses and kingdoms that ruled South India.

This movement was ushered in by the Haridasas (lit "servants of Lord Hari") and took shape in the 13th century – 14th century CE period, prior to and during the early rule of the Vijayanagara Empire.  The main objective of this movement was to propagate the Dvaita philosophy of Madhvacharya (Madhva Siddhanta) to the masses through a literary medium known as Dasa Sahitya (lit "literature of the servants of the lord").

Prominent Hindu philosophers, poets and scholars such as Sripadaraya, Vyasathirtha, Vadirajatirtha, Purandara Dasa and Kanaka Dasa played an important role during this time. Though the movement found its roots in the  Kannada country and later spread to other parts of South India, it was a net result of earlier devotional movements such as the Veerashaiva movement (of Vachana literature in Kannada) of northern Karnataka led by Basavanna (12th century) and the Alvar saints of Tamil Nadu (10th century). Later, Vallabhacharya in Gujarat and Guru Chaitanya were influenced by the teachings of Madhvacharya. Chaitanya's devotees started the International Society for Krishna Consciousness - known colloquially as the Hare Krishna Movement.

The Haridasas were saints, some of whom were wandering bards, and considered themselves as slaves of their supreme lord - Hari. While the movement was mainly heralded by the Brahmins, it was a devotional one whose ideals and thoughts pervaded and received noteworthy contributions from all sections of society. The Haridasa movement can be considered as a part of a larger Bhakti movement whose devotional inspiration to the masses lasted over a millennium. The Haridasa movement made significant contribution to Kannada devotional literature.

Origin
The origin of the Haridasa movement is not clearly known, with some legends indicating there were holy men and kings who espoused this form of devotion as early as the 9th century. The Haridasas' songs attribute Sripadaraya as the movement's true founder in the 15th century, despite the Srikurmam inscription suggesting that Narahari Tirtha, the direct disciple of Madhvacharya may have been its originator. However it is well known that the great Vaishnava religious devotionalism called Dasa Kuta found its organizational base and started to produce large congregation of devotees in the Karnataka region, largely due to the Vedanta (philosophy) propounded in the 13th century by Madhvacharya of Udupi (1238 - 1317 CE).

The Haridasas' who propagated the philosophy of Madhvacharya belonged to two groups; the Dasakuta, those who conveyed the philosophy of Madhvacharya in simple and lucid Kannada to the masses, and the Vyasakuta, those who were required to be proficient in the Vedas, Upanishads and other Darshana (scriptures). During this period, this movement became a strong spiritual force which helped a resurgence of a strong Hindu sentiment in Southern India, when Northern India was already under Muslim rule. The Haridasas' found state patronage in the Vijayanagara Empire which at its peak, ruled over the entire Southern India. Vyasatirtha was intimately associated with the empire and was considered the family guru by King Krishnadevaraya.

Haridasas' belonged to the Vaishnava school of Hinduism and worshipped Vitthala, a manifestation of the Hindu god Vishnu and all forms of Krishna (an avatar of Vishnu). The Vittalanatha temple at Pandharapura on the bank of the river Bhima in present-day Maharashtra, the Vittala Swami temples at Hampi in Karnataka and the Srinivasa temple on Tirumala hills in Andhra Pradesh, Raghavendra Swamy Mutt in Mantralaya, Lord Shri Krishna in Udupi, Shri ChennaKeshava Temple in Belur, and almost all ancient Vaishnavite temples are considered the pivotal in the Haridasa context.

Preachers
The Haridasas' generally hailed from places in present-day Karnataka, but there were some exceptions such as Jayatirtha who was a native of Mangalvedhe near Pandharapur in modern Maharashtra and Naraharitirtha who was a native of either Andhra Pradesh or Orissa. Naraharitirtha (1281), a minister in the court of Kalinga was inducted into the Madhvacharya order. He composed many early devotional hymns in praise of Vishnu in the Kannada language, some of which are available today. While the Srikurmam inscription indicates that Naraharitirtha may have been the originator of this devotional movement, the songs of the Haridasas' give credit to Sripadaraya as the real founder of the movement in the 15th century.

Famous haridasas from the Madhvacharya order during the Vijayanagar empire period were:
 Naraharitirtha (1243 - 1333 CE)
 Akshobhyatirtha ( 1282-  1365 CE)
 Jayatirtha (1345 –  1388 CE)
 Sripadaraya (1404 - 1502 CE.)
 Vyasatirtha (1447 - 1539 CE.)
 Purandara Dasa (1480 - 1564 CE.)
 Kanaka Dasa (1508 - 1606 CE.)
Vijayindratirtha (1514-1595 CE)
 Raghuttamatirtha (1537 - 1596 CE)
Raghavendratirtha (1595 - 1671 CE)
 Vadirajatirtha (1480 - 1600 CE.; lived for 120 years).

Growth and patronage 
Sripadaraya, Vyasatirtha and Vadirajatirtha are called "three great saints" (yathi raja trayaru, as they were accorded royal patronage) in the Haridasa movement whereas the epithet "great trinity of Vaishnava composers" from Karnataka goes to Sripadaraya, Purandaradasa and Kanakadasa, though it is difficult to separate literature, music, devotion from their composite writings. The center of their activity in the 15th–16th century was Hampi, the royal centre of Vijayanagara, the regal capital of Vijayanagara empire.

The Haridasa movement gained further impetus in the 17th and 18th centuries in and around Raichur District. Some of the noted saints from this era were Guru Raghavendra, Vijaya Dasa, Gopala Dasa, Jagannatha Dasa, Prasanna Venkata Dasa, Pranesha Dasa, Venugopala Dasa also known as Panganama Timmanna Dasa, Mahipathi Dasa, Mohanna Dasa, Helevanakatte Giriamma and Harapanhalli Bhimavva. The history of the Haridasa movement from the 13th century to the present day is the history of spreading Hari bhakti (devotion to Hari or Vishnu) to the common man and in that purpose contributed immensely to Kannada literature and to the development of Kannada language. Both the Haridasa and Veerashaiva movements pervade the length and breadth of Karnataka and exert ennobling influences upon the neighboring provinces of Andhra Pradesh, Tamil Nadu and Maharashtra.

Contribution to Kannada Literature

Haridasa movement made a significant contribution towards Kannada literature by spawning a whole corpus of devotional literature in the form of verses, hymns and musical compositions, popularizing the Dvaita philosophy postulated by Saint Madhvacharya.  The literature that originated from this devotional movement is called Dasa Sahitya (or dasara padagalu - literature of the dasas). These various compositions are generally called as Devaranamas (literally meaning names of the Lord) and are sung in the praise of the god Vishnu. These compositions have the concept of Hari Bhakti (devotion to God) at their core and they usually revolve around references to Hindu mythology and the Dvaita philosophy. Some Haridasas' such as Purandara Dasa and Kanaka Dasa also composed several Devaranamas using day-to-day episodes, morals and virtues as the central theme. These compositions were in simple Kannada language since the main objective of this movement was to take the devotional movement to the common man. In doing so, the common people were also educated in the importance of consciousness (jnana), devotion (bhakti), ethics and Hindu religion. Their hymns (padas) set to various musical tones (ragas) aroused fervor among the masses. As advocates of religious reform, the Haridasas' propounded the virtues of detachment (vairagya). Similes and metaphors found in their songs and hymns were used to great effect in achieving this. In addition to devotional songs, Kanaka Dasa authored five literary classical writings in the kavya style. Jagannathadasa, Vijaya Dasa and Gopaladasa etc., are more well known among a galaxy of composers who made rich contributions to Kannada literature.

The compositions can be broadly classified under one of the following three types:
 Kavya or poetic compositions
 Tatva or philosophic compositions
 General compositions.

Pen name (Ankita Nama)
Each Haridasa had a unique ankita nama, or pen-name, with which they 'signed' all their compositions. The pen names of some of the most well known Haridasas is listed below:

Contribution to Carnatic music
The Haridasa movement developed the Carnatic music tradition as a distinct art form from the Hindustani style there by heralding a renaissance in the world of Indian classical music. Purandara Dasa, one of the foremost of Haridasas' is known as the "Father of carnatic music" (Karnataka Sangeeta Pitamaha) for his invaluable contributions to this art form. He was a prolific composer. Historians propose the number of his compositions in the Kannada language were as many as 75,000 - 475,000, though only few hundreds are available today. He composed several Kirtane which later served as the foundation for the Kriti form, elaborated and perfected by the Trinity of Carnatic music. He codified and consolidated the teaching of Carnatic music by evolving several graded steps such as sarali, jantai, thattu varisai, alankara and geetham, and laid down a framework for imparting formal training in the art form. The structure and lessons he formulated four centuries ago remain the foundation for all students of Carnatic music. Apart from Purandara Dasa, several later Haridasas' composed songs adhering to the same musical and philosophical traditions. Their compositions usually fell in one of the following categories: Padagalu (or Devaranama- devotional hymns), Kriti, Ugabhoga, Suladi, Vruttanama, Dandaka, Tripadi (three line poetry), Pattadi, Sangathya and Ragale (lyrical verses in blank verse). These forms of composition are still prevalent in South India and especially in Karnataka.

Though these compositions usually adhere to the carnatic style of music, some of these compositions have also been sung in the Hindustani style by musicians such as Bhimsen Joshi and Gangubai Hangal.

See also
Carnatic music
Dvaita
Vijayanagara empire

Notes

References

External links
 A collection of more than 20,000 compositions of 151 Haridasas
 Brief life sketches and English translations of many prominent Haridasas

Bhakti-era Hindu sects
Madhva tradition
Vaishnava sects
Dvaita Vedanta
Haridasa
History of Karnataka
Kannada literature
Carnatic music